Doug Wilson is a former NASCAR Grand National Series race car driver who drove 1086 laps in his entire NASCAR career - for a distance of . His total earnings as a driver were $750 ($ when inflation is taken into effect) while starting 27th on average and finishing 21st on average. Wilson mainly drove the #48 Ford machine for Mr. W.S. Jenkins.

References

NASCAR drivers
Sportspeople from Greensboro, North Carolina
Racing drivers from North Carolina
Living people
Year of birth missing (living people)